The 2000 WNBA season was the fourth season for the Los Angeles Sparks. The team set a 28-4 record, the best in league history, but they were unable to go for the WNBA Finals, losing in the conference finals in a sweep to the Houston Comets.

Offseason
Gordana Grubin was picked up by the Indiana Fever, while Nina Bjedov was selected by the Seattle Storm in the 2000 WNBA Expansion Draft.

WNBA Draft

Regular season

Season standings

Season schedule

Playoffs

Player stats

References

Los Angeles Sparks seasons
Los Angeles
Los Angeles Sparks